Umashree (born 10 May 1957) is an Indian actress and politician. She is known for her portrayal of film roles spoken in the Kannada language (over 400), particularly comic roles. She received National Film Award for Best Actress for her role as Gulabi in the 2008 Kannada movie Gulabi Talkies. In 2013, Umashree became a Member of the Legislative Assembly in Karnataka in the government of Siddaramaiah where she was the minister for women and child development, empowerment of the differently abled and senior citizens, Kannada language and culture.

Personal life 
Umashree was born into the Devanga family. She has two children, a daughter named Gayathri, who is a dentist, and a son named Vijayakumar, an advocate, she raised them as a single mother.

Public office 

Umashree participates in positive social activities such as supporting rural and disadvantaged women. She performs on stage in rural villages to highlight their needs. Her election in 2013 as the member for Terdal constituency (Congress Party) allowed Umashree to continue her work. Umashree is Minister for Women and Child Development, Kannada and Culture.

Stage work 
Umashree has experience in village, amateur, mythological and professional drama. Her directors have included Fritz Bennewitz, B.V. Karanth, Girish Karnad, C. G. Krishnaswamy, R. Nagesh, and T.S. Nagabharana. She is a member of Rangasampada amateur theatre group of Bangalore.

Film work 

Umashree began her movie career in 1984 with an award-winning  performance in a supporting role in Anubhava with Kashinath. But before that she was seen in a 1980 Kannada film BANGARADA JINKE directed by T S Nagabharana.

However, it typecast her in comedy roles with a degree of innuendo. She worked with the actor N. S. Rao and later with Dinesh, Dwarakish, Mysore lokesh, Sihikahi chandru, Ramesh bhat, Mukhyamantri Chandru, Doddanna and Karibasavaiah. Her directors included S. V. Rajendra Singh Babu, Bhargava, Singeetham Srinivasa Rao, Perala, K V Raju, Vijay, Dorai Bhagavan, Dwairakish, D Rajendra babu, Dinesh Babu, V Ravichandran, Puri Jagannath and Yograj Bhat.

Television work 
 Nondavara Haadu, a documentary about leprosy directed by T. S. Ranga for Doordarshan.
 Hattye, a telefilm H. Girijamma for Doordarshan.
 Musanje, a serial directed by T. S. Nagabarana for Udaya TV.
 Musanje Katha Prasanga, a serial directed by Prakash Belawadi for ETv.
 Kicchu, a serial directed by Chaitanya for ETv.
 Amma Ninagagi for ETv.
 Arathigobba Kirthigobba for Star Suvarna.
 Chinnara Chilipili for Udaya TV.
 Puttakkana Makkalu for Zee Kannada

Awards 

2004 - Karnataka State Film Award for Best Supporting Actress for the Film, Mani 
 2008 - National film Award for best actress for the Film, Gulabi Talkies ( 55th National Film Awards).
 2020-21 - Best Supporting Actress for Rathnan Prapancha

Partial filmography

 Anubhava (1984)
 Amrutha Ghalige (1984)
 Bidugadeya Bedi (1985)
 Naanu Nanna Hendthi (1985)
 Swabhimana (1985)
 Maneye Manthralaya (1986)
 Bete (1986)
 27 Mavalli Circle (1986)
 Asambhava (1986)
 Ee Bandha Anubandha (1987)
 Jayasimha (1987)
 Olavina Udugore (1987)
 Sowbhagya Lakshmi (1987)
 Digvijaya (1987)
 Shanthi Nivasa (1987)
 Onde Goodina Hakkigalu (1988)
 Ramanna Shamanna (1988)
 Krishna Rukmini (1988)
 Balondu Bhavageethe (1988)
 Anjada Gandu (1988)
 Jana Nayaka (1988)
 Ranadheera (1988)
 Hrudaya Geethe (1989)
 Hongkongnalli Agent Amar (1989)
 Ondagi Balu (1989)
 Onti Salaga (1989)
 Poli Huduga (1989)
 Doctor Krishna (1989)
 Golmaal Radhakrishna (1990)
 Mruthyunjaya (1990)
 Nigooda Rahasya (1990)
 Rani Maharani (1990)
 Nammoora Hammera (1990)
 Bangaradantha Maga (1991)
 Ranachandi (1991)
 Gruhapravesha (1991)
 Kollur Kala (1991)
 Neenu Nakkare Haalu Sakkare (1991)
 Sriramachandra (1992)
 Shivanaga (1992)
 Mannina Doni (1992)
 Malashree Mamashree (1992)
 Sangya Balya (1992)
 Server Somanna (1993)
 Kollura Sri Mookambika (1993)
 Kotreshi Kanasu (1994)
 Jaana (1994)
 Chinna (1994)
 Karulina Koogu (1994)
 Odahuttidavaru (1994)
 Putnanja (1995)
 Himapatha (1995)
 Thumbida Mane (1995)
 Jeevanadhi (1996)
 Sipayi (1996)
 Ibbara Naduve Muddina Aata (1996)
 Aadithya (1996)
 Dhani(movie) (1996)
 Muddina Kanmani (1997)
 Thayavva (1997)
 Mommaga (1997)
 Cheluva (1997)
 Kalavida (1997)
 Ellaranthalla Nanna Ganda (1997)
 Preethsod Thappa (1998)
 Viralukketha Veekkam (1999)
 O Premave (1999)
 Chora Chittha Chora (1999)
 Shabdavedhi (2000)
 Krishna Leele (2000)
 Yaarige Saluthe Sambala (2000)
 Nan Hendthi Chennagidale (2000)
 Kurigalu Saar Kurigalu (2001) as Rukmini
 Kothigalu Saar Kothigalu (2001) as Muniyamma
 Diggajaru (2001)
 Simhadriya Simha (2002)
 Thuntata (2002) as "Lingo leela"
 Chandu (2002)
 Nanjundi (2003)
 Abhi (2003)
 Laali Haadu (2003)
 Namma Preethiya Ramu (2003)
 Katthegalu Saar Katthegalu (2003) as Jayamma 
 Mani (2003)
 Ajju (2004)
 Ranga SSLC (2004) as Paaru
 Malla (2004)
 Monalisa (2004)
 Veeru (2005)
 Chellata (2006)
 Neelakanta (2006)
 Suntaragaali (2006)
 Parodi (2007)
 Ekadantha (2007) as Sheela devi
 Gulabi Talkies (2008)
 Mast Maja Maadi (2008)
 Vasanthakala (2008)
 Venkata in Sankata (2009)
 Gilli (2009)
 Kanasemba Kudureyaneri (2010)
 Krishnan Love Story (2010)
 Swayam Krushi (2011)
 Ujwadu (2011)
 Rajadhani (2011)
 Alemari (2012)
 Bheema Theeradalli (2012)
 Sangolli Rayanna (2012)
 Kalpana (2012)
 Rambo (2012)
 Super Shastri (2012)
 Kalavu (2013)
 Paraari (2013)
 Ambareesha (2014)
 Love You Alia (2015)
 Rathnan Prapancha (2021) as Saroja
 Vedha (2022) as Shankri

References

External links 

 

1957 births
20th-century Indian actresses
21st-century Indian actresses
21st-century Indian women politicians
21st-century Indian politicians
Actresses from Karnataka
Actresses in Kannada cinema
Best Actress National Film Award winners
Filmfare Awards South winners
Indian actor-politicians
Indian film actresses
Indian National Congress politicians from Karnataka
Indian television actresses
Indian voice actresses
Indian women comedians
Kannada people
Living people
People from Tumkur district
State cabinet ministers of Karnataka
Women state cabinet ministers of India
Karnataka MLAs 2013–2018
Women members of the Karnataka Legislative Assembly